Spantax Flight 995 was a charter flight from Madrid-Barajas Airport to New York via Málaga Airport on September 13, 1982. When the DC-10 aircraft was rolling for take-off from Malaga, the pilot felt a strong and worsening vibration and aborted the take-off. The flight crew lost control of the aircraft and were unable to stop in the runway available and the aircraft overran the runway, hit an airfield aerial installation, losing an engine, then crossed the Malaga–Torremolinos Highway, hitting a number of vehicles before finally hitting a railway embankment and bursting into flames. An emergency evacuation of the aircraft was carried out but 50 on board died of both burns and other injuries. A further 110 people were hospitalized.

The cause of the accident was the detachment of fragments from a recapped tread on the right wheel of the nose gear, creating a strong vibration. Standard procedure calls for takeoff to continue after V1, and the pilots initially followed such; however, the vibration severely worsened upon rotation, and so, not knowing the cause of the vibration, the captain aborted the takeoff, despite having passed Vr. Later investigations determined that this was reasonable under the abnormal circumstances. It was noted that pilot training only covered engine failures on take-off and there was a lack of training on wheel failures.

An audio-visual specialist at Pace University, Carlton Maloney, was recording audiotape during the accident as part of a series of recordings of airplane takeoffs and landings. As it became clear that something was going wrong, he began to report on the incident and its immediate aftermath. Chicago DJ Steve Dahl played Maloney's tape on his 26 March 2010 podcast.

References

External links

 Accident Report (Archive)
 Accident report (Archive) 

Aviation accidents and incidents in 1982
Aviation accidents and incidents in Spain
Airliner accidents and incidents caused by mechanical failure
Accidents and incidents involving the McDonnell Douglas DC-10
Spantax accidents and incidents
1982 in Spain
September 1982 events in Europe